The Tjodan Power Station  is a hydroelectric power station located in Forsand, Rogaland, Norway. It opened in 1985.

The power plant collects water resources from six bodies of water in Tjodanvassdraget, the mountain plateau north of Lysefjorden. The fall height is 892 metres and the installed output is 110 MW

See also

References 

Hydroelectric power stations in Norway
Buildings and structures in Rogaland